Sophia Tesfamariam Yohannes is the Permanent Representative of Eritrea to the United Nations, having presented her credentials to UN Secretary-General António Guterres on September 5, 2019.

She earned a Bachelor of Science degree in management from Western International University in Phoenix, Arizona.

References

 
Women ambassadors
Permanent Representatives of Eritrea to the United Nations
Year of birth missing (living people)
Living people